Shanghai Gezhi High School (Chinese: 上海市格致中学), also referred to as Gezhi, is a comprehensive three-year public high school. Its main campus is located in the People's Square area in Huangpu District, Shanghai. Previously known as the Gezhi Academy, was founded by chemist , mathematician , and British missionary   in 1874.

References

Educational institutions established in 1874
High schools in Shanghai
1874 establishments in China